The Kennedy Memorial Winter Games were an international multi-sport competition event held in Lake Placid, New York from January 9 to March 15, 1970.  The Games were held as a tribute to John F. Kennedy and his brother Robert F. Kennedy.  President Kennedy had been an advocate of physical fitness and in 1963 urged the development of programs to allow American youth to participate in international sports competitions. The program included competition in figure skating, bobsled, luge, ski jumping, cross-country skiing, and ice hockey.

Games
 1970 Kennedy Memorial Winter Games

Sports
The program included competition in figure skating, bobsled, luge, ski jumping, cross-country skiing, and ice hockey.

 figure skating
 bobsled
luge
ski jumping
cross-country skiing
ice hockey

Figure skating
The figure skating events took place March 13-15, and included competitions in ladies' and men's single skating and pair skating with entrants from 10 countries.  This was the first international invitational senior figure skating competition held in the United States, predating the first Skate America competition which was held in 1979.

Men's results

Ladies' results

Pairs results

References

1970 in multi-sport events
1970 in figure skating
Figure skating in the United States
Figure skating at multi-sport events
Winter multi-sport events
1970 in winter sports